Carnegie Museum may refer to:

 Carnegie Museum of the Keweenaw, museum located in Michigan
 Carnegie Museum of Montgomery County, museum located in Indiana
 Carnegie Museums of Pittsburgh, a group of four museums in Pittsburgh, PA, including:
 Carnegie Museum of Art
 Carnegie Museum of Natural History
Carnegie Science Center
Andy Warhol Museum